USS Chatham (AK-169) was an  commissioned by the U.S. Navy for service in World War II. She was responsible for delivering troops, goods and equipment to locations in the war zone.

Construction
The third Chatham commissioned by the Navy, was launched 13 May 1944 by Froemming Brothers, Inc., Milwaukee, Wisconsin, under a Maritime Commission contract, MC hull 2142,; sponsored by Mrs. G. C. Salisbury; acquired by the Navy 20 January 1945; and commissioned at Galveston, Texas, 22 February 1945.

Service history

World War II Pacific Theatre operations
Chatham arrived at Pearl Harbor 6 May 1945 to carry cargo to Eniwetok, Saipan, and Guam, before returning to San Francisco, 18 July for a brief overhaul. She cleared San Francisco 13 August, and until 30 January 1946, when she returned to San Francisco once more, carried cargo from Okinawa to Guam, Manus, Saipan, Eniwetok, and the Philippines, aiding in the redeployment of American strength in the Pacific Ocean which followed the war.

Post-war decommissioning
From the US West Coast, she sailed to Baltimore, Maryland, where she was decommissioned 2 April 1946 and returned to the Maritime Commission, 4 April 1946.

Merchant service
Chatham was acquired by the Koninklijke Nederlandsche Stoomboot Mattschappij, N.V. of Amsterdam, Holland, and renamed Helena, the former Navy cargo ship operated out of Amsterdam, under the Dutch flag, from 1949 to 1963.

She was sold in 1963 to the Bahamas Line, Panama, and renamed Lincoln Express. She broke in two and sank 15 December 1972, in heavy weather West of San Juan, Puerto Rico, with a load of Gypsum. All but one of her crew were rescued by the USCG buoy tender .

Military awards and honors 
The record does not indicate any battle stars for Chatham. However, her crew was eligible for the following medals:
 American Campaign Medal
 Asiatic-Pacific Campaign Medal
 World War II Victory Medal
 Navy Occupation Service Medal (with Asia clasp)

Notes 

Citations

Bibliography 

Online resources

External links

 

Alamosa-class cargo ships
Chatham County, Georgia
Chatham County, North Carolina
Ships built in Milwaukee
1944 ships
World War II auxiliary ships of the United States
Maritime incidents in 1972